Cephalodiscus sibogae is a sessile hemichordate belonging to the order Cephalodiscida. Sightings of the species has been reported only once.

References

sibogae